Rogue Leaders: The Story of LucasArts is a book about the history of the video game developer and publisher LucasArts, by PlayStation: The Official Magazines Editor-in-Chief Rob Smith, with a foreword by George Lucas.

Summary 
In 1982, George Lucas saw potential in the fledgling videogame industry and created his own interactive-entertainment company. Twenty-five years and dozens of award-winning games later, LucasArts has earned a prestigious place in the industry and in the hearts of gamers everywhere. Rogue Leaders is the first substantive survey of a videogame companya deluxe compilation that traces its history through never-before-published interviews. In addition, more than 300 pieces of concept art, character development sketches, and storyboards have been lavishly reproduced to showcase the creative talent behind such videogame classics as The Secret of Monkey Island, Grim Fandango, and Star Wars: Knights of the Old Republic, as well as games that were never publicly released. A thrill for millions of videogame and LucasArts fans around the world. The book aims to tell the history of the first 25 years of LucasArts game development and publishing, from its beginning as Lucasfilm Games, to the 2008 releases such as Lego Indiana Jones: The Original Adventures.

The book is also an art book, as it features concept art and unused art concepts from LucasArts games.

References

External links
Rogue Leaders: The Story of LucasArts at Chronicle Books

2008 non-fiction books
American history books
Books about video games
Lucasfilm